Seamless Distribution Systems (SDS), a Swedish software company listed on Nasdaq First North Premier (ticker: SDS), currently operates in over 50 markets in Africa, Asia, Middle East, Europe and North America.

SDS provides software platforms and services for digital sales and distribution to private consumers through mobile operators in emerging markets. The company has a global customer footprint in over 50 countries, reaching over 500 million mobile users through more than 2 million active points of sale. SDS’ platforms process 15 billion transactions annually, worth more than US$14 billion in value.

Products and services 

SDS provides software platforms for electronic transactions and digitization of supply chains. They have an extensive portfolio of scalable solutions, and some of their offerings include:

 Airtime top-up 
 Electronic recharge platforms 
 Voucher management solutions 
 Mobile money 
 Mobile financial solutions 
 Order and inventory management 
 Dealer management systems 
 Retailer value management 
 Trip management & route-tracking 
 Information & market insights management 
 Onboarding, recruitment & KYC 
 Campaign management solutions 
 Mobile apps 
 Microcredit 
 Business Intelligence 
 Consulting and training 

Through these products, they aim to enable trade partners, telecom operators, distributors, and service providers to drive revenue growth.

Operations 

SDS has an extensive and growing client base across Africa, Asia, Europe, and Central America. Some of their major clients include:

 MTN Nigeria
 MTN Ghana
 MTN South Africa
 Ethio Telecom
 MTN Congo
 MTN Liberia
 MTN Zambia
 MTN South Sudan
 MTN Yemen
 MTN Syria
 Ooredoo Indonesia
 Oreedoo Algeria
 Oreedoo Tunisia
 GoSoft (7Eleven) Thailand
 Zain Kuwait
 Zain Iraq
 Zain Saudi Arabia
 Aliv Bahamas
 Swedish Bank Recharge Switch

Offices 

SDS has its head office in Stockholm, Sweden with regional offices in India, France, Pakistan, Ghana, Nigeria, Romania, and UAE.

History 

 In 2001, SDS was formed as a digital value distribution company and experienced working primarily with the retail and banking industries. 
 In 2006, SDS partnered with Ericsson for global distribution and channel management. 
 In 2011, SDS formed a global partnership with MTN Group which is the largest telecom operator in emerging markets and Africa's most respected brand.
 In 2016, SDS won the Global Telecom Business Award for Software and Applications Innovation.
 In 2017, SDS was registered as an independent public company and listed on NASDAQ First North Premier.
 In 2018, SDS acquired Seamless Digital Distribution (formerly known as Invuo eProducts) allowing them to expand their market share in Scandinavia.
 In 2019, SDS acquired competitor, eServGlobal which led to rapid growth and expansion in the Middle East, Asia, and Africa.
 In 2020, SDS entered partnership with CSG for a project involving the digitization of sales and distribution channels of a telecom operator in Mongolia.
 In 2021, SDS acquired Riaktr, a global supplier of analytic software solutions.

References

Companies based in Stockholm